Stadionul Milcovul, also known as Stadionul Milcovul Sud, is a multi-use stadium in Focşani, Romania. It is currently used mostly for football matches and is the home ground of CSM Focșani. The stadium's name comes from Milcov River and holds 8,500 people.

References

External links
Stadionul Milcovul (Sud). soccerway.com

Football venues in Romania
Focșani
Buildings and structures in Vrancea County